This is a list of people who were born in, lived in, or are closely associated with the city of Charlotte, North Carolina.

Academia
Graham Tillett Allison Jr., American political scientist and professor at the John F. Kennedy School of Government at Harvard University
Katharine Cramer Angell, one of two named founders of The Culinary Institute of America
Sonya Curry, educator
Christopher Ellison, sociologist specializing in the sociology of religion
Chris Folk, served in the office of School Community Relations for the Charlotte Mecklenburg County Schools during desegregation
Martha Louise Morrow Foxx, pioneering educator for the blind
Edith Henderson, landscape architect
John Kuykendall, served as 15th president of Davidson College
Paul Marion, university administrator and academic
George C. Williams, evolutionary biologist
Anne D. Yoder, biologist, researcher, and professor

Art and literature

Romare Bearden (1911–1988), artist and writer
Brian Blanchfield, poet and essayist
Jason V. Brock, filmmaker, musician, artist, and author
Don Brown, author and attorney
W. J. Cash, writer and journalist
Silas Farley, ballet dancer, choreographer and educator
Brent Funderburk, artist
Harry Golden, author
Hank Hanegraaff, author, radio talk-show host, former advocate of evangelical Christianity (until 2017 with his conversion to Eastern Orthodox faith)
Cheris F. Hodges, author
Travis Jeppesen, author
Ben Long, artist, most known for his fresco work and drawings
Carson McCullers, author
Jenny Offill, novelist
Diane Oliver (1943–1966), a Black feminist writer
Kathy Reichs, anthropologist and author
Stephanie S. Tolan, children's book author
Mel Tomlinson, ballet and modern dancer
Justin Tornow, dancer and choreographer

Business

Irwin Belk, businessman and politician, executive with Belk department stores
Cy Bahakel, former North Carolina State Senator and media magnate, instrumental in bringing Charlotte Hornets franchise to Charlotte
Jim Crockett Jr., former professional wrestling promoter
Richard Darman, businessman and government official who served in senior positions during the presidencies of Ronald Reagan and George H. W. Bush
Elisabeth DeMarse, businesswoman, former chairman and CEO of TheStreet
James Buchanan Duke, industrialist, founder of The Duke Endowment and Duke University
Jay Faison, entrepreneur and a conservative philanthropist, founder of the ClearPath Foundation
Jack Fulk (1932–2011), founder of fast-food chain Bojangles' Famous Chicken 'n Biscuits
Earl Patterson Hall, real estate developer and businessman who founded Carowinds
Robert L. Johnson, co-founder of BET, former majority owner of then Charlotte Bobcats, first black American billionaire
Michael Jordan, former professional Hall of Fame basketball player, principal owner & chairman of the Charlotte Hornets
Herman Lay, involved in potato chip manufacturing with his eponymous brand of Lay's potato chips
Leon Levine, founder of Family Dollar; billionaire, businessman and philanthropist
Michael Marsicano, President and CEO of The Foundation for the Carolinas, one of the largest philanthropic community foundations in the country in terms of assets
Hugh McColl, former chairman and CEO of Bank of America
Bruton Smith, billionaire; founder and CEO of Speedway Motorsports, Inc. and founder of Sonic Automotive
Clemmie Spangler, businessman, former president of the 16-campus University of North Carolina system from 1986 to 1997; was No. 117 on Forbes list of 400 richest Americans
David S. Taylor, business executive who is currently the chairman, President, and CEO of Procter & Gamble
Robert Yates, former owner of NASCAR Cup Series team Yates Racing
 Blake R Van Leer III, notable entrepreneur, grandson of President of Georgia Tech, Inventor, Civil rights advocate

Entertainment

Tyler Barnhardt, actor, best known for Underground, 13 Reasons Why
Melendy Britt, actress
Ben Browder, actor, Farscape and Stargate SG-1
Ayesha Curry, actress, celebrity cook, author
Nick Cannon, Television host, Rapper, actor, comedian, attended Quail Hollow Middle School
Mark Freiburger, filmmaker
Rohit Gupta, film director, producer
Ali Hillis, actress
Lauren Holt, actress, comedian, singer, and cast member of Saturday Night Live
Brian Huskey, actor, comedian, and writer
Billy James (publicist), musician, producer, and writer 
Dwayne 'The Rock' Johnson, actor, former professional wrestler, attended Montclaire Elementary School
Emeril Lagasse, celebrity chef, television personality, attended Johnson & Wales University
Sharon Lawrence, actress, known for NYPD Blue 
Chyler Leigh, actress
Ross McElwee, documentary filmmaker; professor at Harvard University
Eva Noblezada, actress, singer
Jim Rash, actor in NBC/Yahoo's Community
Britt Robertson, actress
Gloria Saunders, actress 
Randolph Scott, actor, 1940s and '50s film star
Jessica Stroup, actress, best known for portraying Erin Silver on 90210
Berlinda Tolbert, actress on CBS sitcom The Jeffersons
Skeet Ulrich, actor, Jericho; graduate of Northwest Cabarrus High School
Earl Wentz, actor, pianist, composer, and musical director, known for his creation of the American Composer Series in 2000
Maurice Williams, songwriter and performer of Maurice William and the Zodiacs, famous for "Stay"

Government and law

Armistead Burwell, associate justice of the North Carolina Supreme Court from 1892 to 1894
Rebecca Carney, Democratic member of the North Carolina General Assembly
Daniel G. Clodfelter, attorney and politician, Democratic mayor of Charlotte, North Carolina
Chris Cole, politician
Charlie Smith Dannelly, educator and politician, Democratic member of the North Carolina General Assembly
Walter E. Dellinger III, professor and solicitor
Ben Elbert Douglas, Sr., mayor of Charlotte, North Carolina 1935–1941
Anthony Foxx, 17th United States Secretary of Transportation, and mayor of Charlotte (2009–2013)
Jim Gulley, member of the North Carolina General Assembly
Richard Hudson, United States Representative for North Carolina's 8th congressional district
Cheslie Kryst, lawyer; Miss North Carolina USA 2019 and Miss USA 2019
Pat McCrory, 74th Governor of North Carolina; longest-serving mayor in Charlotte's history (1995–2009) 
Mick Mulvaney, former United States Special Envoy for Northern Ireland and White House Chief of Staff in the Trump Administration, attended Charlotte Catholic high school
James McDuffie, North Carolina State Senator
James B. McMillan, federal judge who ruled in favor of school busing to integrate Charlotte-Mecklenburg Schools
Sue Myrick, member of the United States House of Representatives; mayor of Charlotte (1987–1991)
Sarah Parker, Chief Justice of the North Carolina Supreme Court (born in Charlotte)
Robert Pittenger, real estate investor; Republican former State Senator in the North Carolina General Assembly (2002–2008)
Jennifer Roberts, politician, community activist, and the 58th Mayor of Charlotte
Toussaint Romain, attorney, public defender, and civil rights figure
Ruth Samuelson, member of the North Carolina General Assembly representing the state's 104th House district
John Spratt, United States Representative for South Carolina's 5th congressional district
Mike Sprayberry, North Carolina Director of Emergency Management
Randy Staten, Minnesota state representative and football player
Anne Tompkins, served as the United States Attorney for the United States District Court for the Western District of North Carolina
Richard Vinroot, attorney and mayor of Charlotte (1991–1995)

Journalism and media

John Bain (1984–2018), British game commentator
Heather Childers, television news anchor
Leigh Diffey, auto racing commentator
William Emerson (1923–2009), journalist; covered the civil rights era as Newsweeks first bureau chief assigned to cover the Southern United States; later editor in chief of The Saturday Evening Post
Mark Kemp, music journalist and author
Anna Kooiman, news anchor and television panelist
Jim Nantz, CBS television sportscaster
Maureen O'Boyle, formerly of Current Affair and Extra; now newscaster for WBTV
Joe Posnanski, sports journalist
Bill Rosinski, sportscaster and talk show host
Sandra Mims Rowe, newspaper journalist
Reed Sarratt, journalist
Beatrice Thompson, broadcast television and radio personality

Military

Jerry K. Crump, soldier in the United States Army; received the Medal of Honor for his actions during the Korean War
Richard T. Devereaux, retired United States Air Force Major General
Charles Duke, NASA astronaut, United States Air Force officer and test pilot, 10th person to walk on the Moon
Jack B. Farris, United States Army lieutenant general
John Gibbon, officer in the Union Army during the American Civil War, also served in the American Indian Wars
Buster Glosson, former deputy chief of staff for plans and operations at the headquarters for the U.S. Air Force in Washington D.C.
Susan J. Helms, Brigadier General-select in the U.S. Air Force and former NASA astronaut
Hunter Marshall III, United States Navy officer during World War II

Musicians
 
 
 
Ant-Bee, musician
Seth Avett, singer and one of the founding members of American folk-rock band The Avett Brothers
Horace Brown, R&B singer
Nappy Brown (1929–2008), R&B and gospel singer
Phillip Bush, classical pianist
Tom Constanten, former keyboard player, Grateful Dead
David L. Cook, Christian singer and comedian; inducted into the 2006 ICGMA Hall of Fame; 2006 Country Gospel Music Entertainer of the Year
DaBaby, rapper, songwriter
Deniro Farrar, rapper
FireHouse, early 1990s "hair metal band"
Flagship, alt-rock band
Anthony Hamilton, R&B singer
Wilbert Harrison, R&B singer
Joe Henry, musician
Hopesfall, hard rock band
Tyrone Jefferson, trombonist
K-Ci & JoJo (Cedric "K-Ci" Hailey & Joel "JoJo" Hailey) of 1990s R&B group Jodeci
Si Kahn, singer-songwriter and activist (resident of Charlotte)
John P. Kee, gospel singer
Adam Lazzara, lead singer of Taking Back Sunday
Jon Lindsay, solo recording artist; former member of Benji Hughes and many other bands; record producer; political activist
Kelsey Lu, singer and cellist
Lute, rapper
John Mark McMillan, singer-songwriter
Tammy Faye Messner (1942–2007), Christian singer and television personality; former wife of televangelist, and later convicted felon, Jim Bakker
Stephanie Mills, R&B singer
David Vincent, frontman, bassist, and singer of the death metal band Morbid Angel
Wednesday 13, musician
Willie Weeks, bass guitarist, known for work with Donny Hathaway, Stevie Wonder and George Harrison
Mavi (rapper), musician

Sportspeople

 

 

Cedric Alexander, professional wrestler signed to WWE
Jaire Alexander, NFL cornerback
Ty-Shon Alexander, professional basketball player
Darrell Armstrong, former National Basketball Association (NBA) player and current NBA coach
Arn Anderson, professional wrestler 
Jim Beatty, first person to break the four-minute mile barrier on an indoor track
Ricky Berens, Olympic swimmer and two-time gold medalist
DeAndre' Bembry, NBA player
Tessa Blanchard, professional wrestler
Muggsy Bogues, former NBA player; played for the Charlotte Hornets 1988–1997
Garrett Bradbury, National Football League (NFL) offensive lineman for the Minnesota Vikings
Calvin Brock, former professional boxer; competed at the 2000 Summer Olympics
William Byron, NASCAR Cup Series driver for Hendrick Motorsports
Chris Canty, former NFL defensive end; Charlotte Latin School alumni
Maya Caldwell, WNBA player for the Atlanta Dream
Dwight Clark, NFL wide receiver and two-time Super Bowl champion with San Francisco 49ers
Stu Cole, former Major League Baseball (MLB) player and current MLB coach
Mo Collins, NFL lineman for the Oakland Raiders
Carlos Crawford, former MLB pitcher 
Dell Curry, former professional basketball player
Seth Curry, NBA player
Stephen Curry, NBA player and 4-time champion with the Golden State Warriors 
Baron Davis, former professional basketball player; played for Charlotte Hornets 1999–2002
Jordan Davis, NFL defensive tackle for the Philadelphia Eagles
John Donaldson, former MLB second baseman
Devon Dotson, NBA G League basketball player for the Windy City Bulls 
Jake Delhomme, former NFL quarterback for the Carolina Panthers 2003–2009
Ray Durham, MLB second baseman and two-time All-Star selection
Charlotte Flair, professional wrestler, daughter of Ric Flair
David Flair, former professional wrestler, son of Ric Flair
Reid Flair, professional wrestler, son of Ric Flair
Ric Flair, former professional wrestler, recognized by WWE as a 16-time World Champion
DeShaun Foster, born in Charlotte, former running back for Carolina Panthers 2002–2007
Todd Fuller, professional basketball player
Joe Gibbs, Hall of Fame football coach and NASCAR championship team owner
Grace Glenn, artistic gymnast
Jeff Gordon, former four-time NASCAR Cup Series champion driver, executive for Hendrick Motorsports; resides in Charlotte 
Dwight Howard, Charlotte Hornets 2017–2018, NBA player
Trent Guy, former NFL and Canadian Football League player
Clayton Heafner, former PGA Tour golfer
Larry Hefner, former NFL linebacker 
Tommy Helms, MLB player with Cincinnati Reds and three other teams; managed Reds in parts of two seasons; member of Reds Hall of Fame
Gerald Henderson Jr., former professional basketball player 
Allen Iverson, former NBA player, member of Naismith Memorial Basketball Hall of Fame, resides in Charlotte
D. J. Humphries, NFL offensive tackle 
Antawn Jamison, NBA forward and former University of North Carolina basketball star
Bobby Jones, basketball player, four-time NBA All-Star and 1972 Olympian  
Daniel Jones, NFL quarterback for New York Giants; attended Charlotte Latin School 
Larry Johnson, Charlotte Hornets 1991–1996, former professional basketball player
Ron "The Truth" Killings, pro wrestler
Hunter Kemper, triathlete, 4-time member of the U.S. Olympic team (2000, 2004, 2008, 2012)
Braxton Key, professional basketball player
Luke Kuechly, former linebacker for the Carolina Panthers 2012–2019
Corey LaJoie, NASCAR Cup Series driver
Kendall Lamm, NFL offensive tackle for the Tennessee Titans
Chris Leak, former Florida Gators quarterback and offensive MVP of 2007 BCS National Championship Game
Dave Lemonds, pitcher for Chicago White Sox
Nick Leverett, NFL offensive guard for the Tampa Bay Buccaneers
Mohamed Massaquoi, NFL wide receiver for Cleveland Browns
J. B. Mauney, Professional Bull Rider 
Jeff McInnis, NBA guard 
Christian McCaffrey, Running back for Carolina Panthers
Mildred Meacham, All-American Girls Professional Baseball League player 
Kennedy Meeks, NBA player
Sam Mills, linebacker who played twelve seasons in the NFL for the New Orleans Saints and Carolina Panthers
Akil Mitchell (born 1992), American-Panamanian basketball player for Maccabi Rishon LeZion of the Israeli Premier League
Tiffany Mitchell, WNBA player
Anthony Morrow, NBA player with the Oklahoma City Thunder; Charlotte Latin School alumni
Alonzo Mourning, former professional basketball player
Daniel Naroditsky, chess grandmaster
Joan Nesbit, former long-distance runner who competed in the 1996 Summer Olympics
Cam Newton, Carolina Panthers quarterback 2011–2019 and 2021–present
Hakeem Nicks, former NFL wide receiver for New York Giants
Dickie Noles, MLB pitcher
Pettis Norman, NFL tight end for the Dallas Cowboys
Ayanga Okpokowuruk, football player
Julius Peppers, former defensive end for the Carolina Panthers 2002–2009 and again 2017–2018
Richard Petty, former seven-time NASCAR Cup Series champion and record winner of 200 NASCAR races
Robert Parish, former NBA player, played for Charlotte Hornets 1994–1996, member of Naismith Memorial Basketball Hall of Fame 
Tony Parker, Charlotte Hornets 2018–2019, former professional basketball player, 4x NBA Champion
Roman Phifer, NFL linebacker 
Wali Rainer, NFL player for Cleveland Browns, Jacksonville Jaguars, Detroit Lions and Houston Texans
Jeff Reed, former NFL kicker for the Pittsburgh Steelers
Cody Rhodes, professional wrestler
Jerry Richardson, former owner of NFL's Carolina Panthers
Jordan Rinaldi, UFC fighter
John Sadri, tennis player, Australian Open singles finalist 
Jaden Springer, professional basketball player
Don Schollander, six-time Olympic champion swimmer 
Corey Seager, MLB shortstop for the Texas Rangers
Kyle Seager, former MLB third baseman for the Seattle Mariners
Floyd Simmons, two-time Olympic bronze medalist in the decathlon
Jamie Skeen, basketball player, plays for Maccabi Ashdod B.C. in the Israeli Super League 
Ish Smith, NBA player
Steve Smith Sr., former NFL wide receiver, played for the Carolina Panthers 2001–2013
Ricky Steamboat, pro wrestler
Bernard Taylor, former boxer, compiled 481–8 record as an amateur boxer, qualified for 1980 U.S. Olympic team
Chad Tracy, MLB third baseman 
Rayjon Tucker, NBA player
Dolly Vanderlip, All-American Girls Professional Baseball League pitcher
Dave Waymer (1959–1993), NFL safety for New Orleans Saints, San Francisco 49ers and Los Angeles Raiders 
Reggie White (1961–2004), NFL defensive end; career leader at time of his retirement in sacks
Steve Wilks, football coach, former head coach of the Arizona Cardinals in 2018
Alex Wood, MLB pitcher
Grant Williams, NBA player for the Boston Celtics; Providence Day School alum
Patrick Williams, professional basketball player 
Kemba Walker, NBA player, played for Charlotte Hornets 2011–2019
Haywood Workman, NBA guard for Indiana Pacers

Miscellaneous

Annie Lowrie Alexander (1864–1929), first licensed female physician in the American South
Chelsea Cooley, Miss North Carolina USA 2005, Miss USA 2005
Olivia Culpo, Miss Rhode Island USA, Miss USA, Miss Universe 2012 
Brooklyn Decker, model, graduated from Butler High School in Matthews, NC; Sports Illustrated Swimsuit Edition cover model
Steven Furtick, pastor
Ryan C. Gordon, software and game porter
Billy Graham (1918–2018), evangelist
Richard Hipp, software architect and primary author of SQLite
Peter Joseph Jugis, prelate of the Roman Catholic Church serving as the fourth and current bishop of the Roman Catholic Diocese of Charlotte
Jordan Lloyd, winner of Season 11 of Big Brother; contestant on Season 16 of The Amazing Race (from suburban Matthews)
Emily Maynard, The Bachelorette, season 8
John Shelby Spong, retired Bishop of Episcopal Diocese of Newark, author, lecturer, and theologian

References

Charlotte
Charlotte